Alucita imbrifera is a species of moth of the family Alucitidae. It is known from the Republic of Congo.

References

Endemic fauna of the Republic of the Congo
Alucitidae
Fauna of the Republic of the Congo
Moths of Africa
Moths described in 1929
Taxa named by Edward Meyrick